CLG Gaeil Fhánada is a Gaelic football club in County Donegal, Ireland.

History
Gaeil Fhánada won the 2013 All-Ireland title in Waterford, the club's first title.

Gaeil Fhánada won the 2022 All-Ireland title after extra-time against Mayo's Cill Chomáin (2–10 to 2–11) in Galway, the second time they won the competition. It was their most significant trophy at adult level for nearly a decade, having earlier contested the 2018 final against Downings and lost.

Notable players

 Paddy Carr — played for Donegal and later managed Kilmacud Crokes and Ballymun Kickhams, was nominated for Donegal manager several times before being appointed in 2022
 Paddy McConigley — 2007 National League winner

Managers

Honours
 Donegal Intermediate Football Championship (2): 2007, 2009
 Donegal Junior Football Championship (2): 1985, 1997
 Comórtas Peile na Gaeltachta Dhún na nGall - Sóisearach: 2018, 2022
 Comórtas Peile na Gaeltachta na hÉireann - Sóisearach: (2): 2013, 2022

References

Gaelic games clubs in County Donegal
Gaelic football clubs in County Donegal